Michael Francis Urbanski (born November 1, 1956) is the Chief United States District Judge on the United States District Court for the Western District of Virginia and a former United States magistrate judge of the same court.

Early life and education
Born in Livorno, Italy, where his father was stationed in the U.S. Army, Urbanski attended Denbigh High School in Newport News, Virginia. Urbanski earned an Artium Baccalaureus degree in 1978 from The College of William & Mary and a Juris Doctor in 1981 from the University of Virginia School of Law. From 1981 until 1982, Urbanski served as a law clerk to Judge James Clinton Turk of the United States District Court for the Western District of Virginia.

Professional career
From 1982 until 1984, Urbanski served as an associate in Washington, D.C. for the law firm Vinson & Elkins.  From 1984 until 2004, he was in private legal practice with the law firm Woods Rogers in Roanoke, Virginia, serving first as an associate from 1984 until 1988, and then as a principal from 1989 until 2004.

Federal judicial service

United States magistrate judge service
In 2004, Urbanski was selected by the judges on the United States District Court for the Western District of Virginia to be a United States magistrate judge.

District court service
On December 1, 2010, President Obama nominated Urbanski to a vacant seat on the United States District Court for the Western District of Virginia that had been created by the decision by Judge Norman K. Moon to assume senior status in July 2010. The Senate Judiciary Committee reported Urbanski's nomination to the full Senate on March 10, 2011. The full Senate confirmed him by a 94–0 vote on May 12, 2011. He received his judicial commission on May 13, 2011. He became Chief Judge on July 3, 2017.

References

External links

1956 births
College of William & Mary alumni
Judges of the United States District Court for the Western District of Virginia
Living people
People from Newport News, Virginia
United States district court judges appointed by Barack Obama
21st-century American judges
United States magistrate judges
University of Virginia School of Law alumni